St George's Church, Gravesend, is a Grade II*-listed Anglican church dedicated to Saint George the patriarch of England, which is situated near the foot of Gravesend High Street in the Borough of Gravesham. It serves as Gravesend's parish church and is located in the diocese of Rochester in Kent, England.

Burials
Pocahontas, Native American wife of English-born colonist John Rolfe, died in Gravesend on her way back to North America at age 20 or 21 and was buried under the chancel of this church on 21 March 1617. When the church was rebuilt in 1731, the exact spot was lost. William Ordway Partridge's bronze statue commemorates her.

References

External links
Parish homepage

Church of England church buildings in Kent
Saint George
Grade II* listed churches in Kent
Diocese of Rochester